Pterostylis concinna, commonly known as the trim greenhood, is a species of orchid endemic to south-eastern Australia and which usually grows in colonies. It has a rosette of leaves at the base and a single dark green, white and orange-red flower.

Description
The dorsal sepal and petals are joined and curve forward forming a hood called the "galea" over the column but the dorsal sepal is longer than the petals. Flowering occurs between May and October.

Taxonomy and naming
Pterostylis concinna was first described in 1810 by Robert Brown and the description was published in Prodromus Florae Novae Hollandiae et Insulae Van Diemen. The specific epithet (concinna) is a Latin word meaning "skilfully put together", "beautiful" or "appropriate".

Distribution and habitat
The trim greenhood is found in New South Wales south of Mudgee and is widespread and locally common in Victoria. It also grows in Tasmania but in only two colonies in South Australia. It grows in moist forest and coastal scrub, often in sandy soil.

References

concinna
Endemic orchids of Australia
Orchids of New South Wales
Orchids of South Australia
Orchids of Tasmania
Orchids of Victoria (Australia)
Plants described in 1810